Chala is a census town and Suburb of Kannur city in the state of Kerala, India and is situated  south of Kannur and lies on National Highway 66 towards Thalassery.

Demographics
As of 2011 Census, Chala had a population of 17,088 with 7,698 males and 9,390 females. Chala had an average literacy rate of 96.7%, higher than the state average of 94%. In Chala, 11% of the population was under 6 years of age.

References

Suburbs of Kannur